Run-length encoding (RLE) is a form of lossless data compression in which runs of data (sequences in which the same data value occurs in many consecutive data elements) are stored as a single data value and count, rather than as the original run.  This is most efficient on data that contains many such runs, for example, simple graphic images such as icons, line drawings, Conway's Game of Life, and animations. For files that do not have many runs, RLE could increase the file size. 

RLE may also be used to refer to an early graphics file format supported by CompuServe for compressing black and white images, but was widely supplanted by their later Graphics Interchange Format (GIF). RLE also refers to a little-used image format in Windows 3.x, with the extension rle, which is a run-length encoded bitmap, used to compress the Windows 3.x startup screen.

Example

Consider a screen containing plain black text on a solid white background.  There will be many long runs of white pixels in the blank space, and many short runs of black pixels within the text. A hypothetical scan line, with B representing a black pixel and W representing white, might read as follows:

  WWWWWWWWWWWWBWWWWWWWWWWWWBBBWWWWWWWWWWWWWWWWWWWWWWWWBWWWWWWWWWWWWWW 

With a run-length encoding (RLE) data compression algorithm applied to the above hypothetical scan line, it can be rendered as follows:

  12W1B12W3B24W1B14W 

This can be interpreted as a sequence of twelve Ws, one B, twelve Ws, three Bs, etc., and represents the original 67 characters in only 18.  While the actual format used for the storage of images is generally binary rather than ASCII characters like this, the principle remains the same.  Even binary data files can be compressed with this method; file format specifications often dictate repeated bytes in files as padding space.  However, newer compression methods such as DEFLATE often use LZ77-based algorithms, a generalization of run-length encoding that can take advantage of runs of strings of characters (such as BWWBWWBWWBWW).

Run-length encoding can be expressed in multiple ways to accommodate data properties as well as additional compression algorithms.  For instance, one popular method encodes run lengths for runs of two or more characters only, using an "escape" symbol to identify runs, or using the character itself as the escape, so that any time a character appears twice it denotes a run.  On the previous example, this would give the following:
 WW12BWW12BB3WW24BWW14

This would be interpreted as a run of twelve Ws, a B, a run of twelve Ws, a run of three Bs, etc.  In data where runs are less frequent, this can significantly improve the compression rate.

One other matter is the application of additional compression algorithms.  Even with the runs extracted, the frequencies of different characters may be large, allowing for further compression; however, if the run lengths are written in the file in the locations where the runs occurred, the presence of these numbers interrupts the normal flow and makes it harder to compress.  To overcome this, some run-length encoders separate the data and escape symbols from the run lengths, so that the two can be handled independently.  For the example data, this would result in two outputs, the string "WWBWWBBWWBWW" and the numbers (12,12,3,24,14).

History and applications

Run-length encoding (RLE) schemes were employed in the transmission of analog television signals as far back as 1967. In 1983, run-length encoding was patented by Hitachi. RLE is particularly well suited to palette-based bitmap images such as computer icons, and was a popular image compression method on early online services such as CompuServe before the advent of more sophisticated formats such as GIF.  It does not work well on continuous-tone images such as photographs, although JPEG uses it on the coefficients that remain after transforming and quantizing image blocks.

Common formats for run-length encoded data include Truevision TGA, PackBits (by Apple, used in MacPaint), PCX and ILBM.  The International Telecommunication Union also describes a standard to encode run-length-colour for fax machines, known as T.45.  The standard, which is combined with other techniques into Modified Huffman coding, is relatively efficient because most faxed documents are generally white space, with occasional interruptions of black.

See also 
 Kolakoski sequence
 Look-and-say sequence
 Comparison of graphics file formats
 Golomb coding
 Burrows–Wheeler transform
 Recursive indexing
 Run-length limited
 Bitmap index
 Forsyth–Edwards Notation, which uses run-length-encoding for empty spaces in chess positions.
 DEFLATE

References

External links 
 Run-length encoding implemented in different programming languages (on Rosetta Code)
 Single Header Run-Length Encoding Library smallest possible implementation (about 20 SLoC) in ANSI C. FOSS, compatible with Truevision TGA, supports 8, 16, 24 and 32 bit elements too.

Lossless compression algorithms